HMS Satellite was an 18-gun sloop, the name ship of her class, built for the Royal Navy during the 1820s.

Description
The ship's tonnage was 466  tons burthen. The Satellite class was armed with a pair of 9-pounder cannon in the bow and sixteen 32-pounder carronades. The ships had a crew of 125 officers and ratings.

Construction and career
Satellite, the third ship of her name to serve in the Royal Navy, was ordered on 9 June 1825, laid down in June 1826 at Pembroke Dockyard, Wales, and launched on 3 October 1826. She was completed on 14 February 1827 at Plymouth Dockyard and commissioned on 22 November 1826.

Notes

References

Satellite-class sloop
1826 ships
Ships built in Pembroke Dock